Potentilla norvegica is a species of cinquefoil known by the common names rough cinquefoil, ternate-leaved cinquefoil, and Norwegian cinquefoil. It is native to Europe, Asia, and parts of North America, and it can be found elsewhere as an introduced species.

Description
Norwegian cinquefoil is usually an annual but may be a short-lived perennial. The leaves are stalked and are either divided into five leaflets, or have three leaflets with the terminal leaflet being divided into three lobes. The basal leaves have narrow, sharp-tipped stipules while the upper leaves have elliptical stipules which are longer than the leaf stalks. The inflorescence is a cyme of several flowers. There are twenty stamens, a separate gynoecium and many pistils. The calyx lengthens after flowering and the fruit is a cluster of pale brown achenes.

Distribution and habitat
Norwegian cinquefoil is native to much of Europe, Asia, and parts of North America, and it can be found in other parts of the world as an introduced species. Its natural habitat is arable fields, gardens, banks, hedgerows, wasteland, logging clearings, loading areas and occasionally shores, often on sandy or gravelly soils.

References

External links

Jepson Manual eFlora (TJM2)
UC CalPhotos gallery

norvegica
Flora of Europe
Flora of temperate Asia
Flora of North America
Flora of California
Plants described in 1753
Taxa named by Carl Linnaeus